William Robert ("Bob") Ell (born circa 1955) is an Australian property developer and businessman with interests in residential, retail, commercial and industrial property.

Biography
The company's head office is located in Sydney; and it has business interests in Queensland, New South Wales and the Australian Capital Territory. In 2012 it was reported that Leda had developed properties worth a total of more than 3 billion since Ell established the group in 1976.

Ell floated Leda on the Australian Stock Exchange in the late 1980s and privatised the company in 1990.

In 2009 it was reported that Ell acted as a surety for Michael McGurk and provided 100,000 in bail for firebombing and assault charges against McGurk; with the charges subsequently dropped. Following the 2009 murder of McGurk, Ell issued a statement detailing his business and personal relationship with McGurk. According to media reports, McGurk had been negotiating on behalf of Ell and for business associates of nightclub identity John Ibrahim to run the downstairs bar area of the Crest in return for an investment of $10–$15 million. In addition, Ell had been a potential sponsor of a proposed western Sydney A-League soccer team, in a deal brokered in 2009 by McGurk. Ell had a longstanding dispute with Greens Tweed Shire councillor Katie Milne where he successfully sued her for defamation in the NSW Supreme Court, and was awarded 15,000 in damages. The defamation action related to an email sent by Milne alleging he had a scandalous association with McGurk.

In 2012 Ell sought and was granted permission by the Privileges Committee of the New South Wales Legislative Council to lodge a Citizen's Right of Reply on behalf of Leda Holdings Pty Limited. The reply related to comments by Cate Faehrmann MLC, a member of the NSW Greens, in the Legislative Council on 9 November 2011. Ell's reply highlighted errors of fact and distortions contained in Faehrmann's speech. The Privileges Committee ordered that the Citizen's Right of Reply be published.

Personal life
Ell is married to Brigit, twenty-six years younger than Ell, and they have four children William, John, Charles and Tiffiany. Ell has a son, and two daughters from his first marriage to Barbara.

Wealth rankings
In 2014, the Business Review Weekly assessed Ell's net worth at 1.29 billion; and Forbes Asia assessed his net worth at 1.10 billion. It was reported between 2000 and 2002 that Ell owned a luxury  catamaran called Leda worth 15 million. In  The Australian Financial Review Rich List, that superseded the BRW Rich 200, estimated Ell's net worth as 1.98 billion in both 2020 and 2021.

References

Living people
Businesspeople from Sydney
Australian businesspeople
Australian billionaires
1940s births